Joshua Jones is a British stop motion children's television series produced by Bumper Films (the company that has also produced Rocky Hollow, Fireman Sam and Starhill Ponies) in 1992.

About
The series is about a cheerful Romani man named Joshua Jones who lives on a canal boat with his canine companion Fairport. They take trips up and down Clearwater Canal, delivering items and carrying out tasks for the folks at Biggott's Wharf and generally having a fun time on the water.

Joshua's bosses are Bapu Karia, a retired Indian admiral, Dakasha "Datsa" Karia, Mr Cashmore's co-worker and Bapu's daughter-in-law, and the get-rich-quick Wilton Cashmore.

Joshua's friends are Joe Laski, the Hungarian farmer who owns a horse named Trojan, Ravi Karia, Mrs. Karia's son (the admiral's grandson) and Fiona, Mr. Cashmore's not-so-money-hungry daughter.

His co-workers are: Sharon, a dizzy blonde girl who owns a catering van, Spanner, Sharon's lazy boyfriend and Daphne Peacock, the vet who takes care of sick and injured animals.

Characters

Adults
 Joshua Jones - A young man who lives in the Karia's Residence and travels by his canal boat with his dog Fairport. His main job is to transport goods along the canals but he is more than willing to utilize his boat to help out others in a crisis.
 Admirable Bapu Karia - A retired Indian admiral who served in the Royal Navy and is always putting his experience to good use in everyday tasks. He is Datsa's father-in-law and Ravi's grandfather.
 Dakasha "Datsa" Karia - The admiral's daughter-in-law and Ravi's mother. She is a very cheerful woman and her first name is only mentioned in the episodes "Tortoise" and "Boomer". Ravi's father never appears, implying that Datsa may be divorced or a widow.
 Joseph "Joe" Laski - A Hungarian-born farmer who lives on a farm on a hill near the tunnel and he takes care of his horse Trojan.
 Daphne Peacock - The local vetarinian who is often called in to take care of sick animals and she is the only character who is seen to drive a car (however Joe Laski is seen driving a tractor in one episode).
 Wilton Cashmore - A local rich busy bee who likes to boss his staff around, especially Spanner. He goes to great lengths to try to impress his own boss, the unseen Mr. Biggott. He can be a nasty man at times when he does not get what he wants. He is the father of Fiona, but his wife and Fiona's mother is never seen or mentioned on the show, implying that Mr. Cashmore may be a widower or divorced.
 Mr. Biggott - Wilton's boss. Although he never appears, Mr. Cashmore speaks to him on the phone in almost every episode. The closest the Biggots get to being seen by the audience is in the episode "Haywire".
 Mrs. Biggott - Mr. Biggott's wife and like her husband, she never appears. She is only mentioned in the episode "Haywire".

Teenagers
 Sharon Cope - A ditsy but bubbly blonde lady who sells food from her bistro wagon by the canal.
 Spencer "Spanner" Wilkins - Sharon's boyfriend; a lazy, accident-prone, orange-haired chap in his early twenties, who does odd-jobs for Cashmore and various other characters. He often skives off work to go and eat at Sharon's cafe.

Children
 Ravi Karia - An eight-year-old boy, Datsa's son and Bapu's grandson.
 Fiona Cashmore - An eight-year-old girl, Wilton Cashmore's daughter.

Animals
 Fairport - A Terrier crossbreed dog, Joshua's faithful animal friend.
 Trojan - Joe's brown horse.
 Boomer - A colourful parrot who was once loaned to the admiral.
 Tearaway Trevor - Ravi's pet tortoise.

Episode list

Home Media releases

VHS
One VHS volume of the series was self-distributed by S4C Video Classics for Wales, known as "Gee Ceffyl Bach a Thair Stori Arall". This VHS contained the same four episodes from the Horseplay VHS, albeit in Welsh. 

Two VHS volumes were released in the United Kingdom by BBC Video. The first volume - "Horseplay", released on 15 June 1992, contained the episodes "Horseplay", "Haywire", "Treasure", and "Boomer". The second volume - simply titled "Joshua Jones 2", was released on 5 July 1993, and contained the episodes "Tortoise", "Sting", "Spook", and "Plum Crazy".

DVD
In Australia, Reel Entertainment released two  DVD volumes each containing six episodes in 2005, simply titled "Volume 1" and "Volume 2". These were "Carry-case" releases, and it was soon followed up with a standard "2 DVD Set" featuring both volumes, making up the complete series.

DVDs of the series have also been released in Poland.

Despite being a British show, the series never had an official DVD release in the UK.

Books
Several paperback books were published by Heinemann Young Books in 1992. The stories were written by Mary Risk and illustrated by The County Studio.
 The C.C. Club
 Josh's Special Delivery (0434948454)
 Duck Tunnel (0434948438)
 Happy Birthday Josh! (0434948411)
 Out of Action (0434962252)
 The Lock Competition (0434962244)
 Vet's Order's
 Piggy In The Middle
 A Party For Bapu
 Heatwave
Eight numbered titles were published by Buzz Books in 1993. The stories were written by Olivia Madden (developed from scripts by Bob Wilson) and illustrated with stills taken from the TV series.
1. Horseplay (1855911396)
2. Going Haywire (1855911388)
3. A Parrot Called Boomer (185591137X)
4. Treasure Trove
5. Photo Finish (1855912333)
6. Snake Chase (1855912341)
7. Tortoise Trail (185591235X)
8. Night Watch (1855912368)

Trivia
 The show aired on ABC TV in Australia, TVP1 in Poland, TV2 in New Zealand, Channel 2 in Jordan, BBC Prime in Iceland, BFBS and SSVC Television in Germany and Network 2 in Ireland.
 The show never made it to the United States.
 In 2002, the show never aired on CBeebies since it was finally shown on the BBC in 1998.
 According to Dave Jones, while making the show, the producers had no idea a similar canal-based children's series was being made at the same time, Rosie and Jim. This series was heavily marketed and overshadowed Joshua Jones, to the extent the series was not a success and lost Bumper Films a lot of money.
 "Paperwork" was originally set as the very first and piloted episode of the entire series of which the characters had early designed faces before they had been updated for the eleven other episodes and the opening titles of all twelve episodes.

References

External links
Toonhound

S4C original programming
British stop-motion animated television series
British children's animated drama television series
1992 British television series debuts
1992 British television series endings
1990s British animated television series
1990s British children's television series
1990s Welsh television series
BBC children's television shows
English-language television shows
Fictional Romani people
Canals in fiction
Television series by Mattel Creations